Simon Iveny (fl. 1304–1305) was an English politician.

He was a Member (MP) of the Parliament of England for New Shoreham in 1304–05.

References

13th-century births
14th-century deaths
English MPs 1305